Gabon is divided into nine provinces, which are further divided into 49 departments.

Provinces

See also
 ISO 3166-2:GA

References

 
Gabon
Gabon